Tranquility Bay was a residential treatment facility affiliated with World Wide Association of Specialty Programs and Schools (WWASPS), located in Calabash Bay, Saint Elizabeth Parish, Jamaica. The facility operated from 1997 to 2009 and received notoriety for its harsh and often abusive treatment of its students, eventually shutting down in 2009 after allegations of child abuse came to light through lawsuits and highly publicized student testimonies.

History
The director was Jay Kay, a college dropout with no training in child development who ran a mini-mart in San Diego, and who is son of WWASPS president Ken Kay. The cost for one child ranged from $25,000 to $40,000 a year. Tranquility Bay was generally acknowledged as the toughest of the WWASPS schools. As with other WWASPS facilities, Tranquility Bay has been the subject of much controversy, including allegations of torture, unsanitary living conditions, unqualified employees, and denial of medical care; these claims have been the subject of multiple lawsuits from former Tranquility Bay residents.

Tranquility Bay stated that it was dedicated to helping parents who are having difficulty with their children, whether they are doing drugs, breaking the law, or being disobedient or disrespectful. In 2003, Kay said "if I have kids, and they start giving me a problem, well, they are going straight in the program. If I had to, I'd pull the trigger without hesitation"; however, in 1999, Kay (who at that time was not working for WWASPS) said that the Tranquility Bay staff were "untrained", without "credentials of any kind", and that Tranquility Bay "could be leading these kids to long-term problems that we don't have a clue about because we're not going about it in the proper way".

Children as young as 12 were admitted to Tranquility Bay, for reasons ranging from drug use to conflicts with a new stepmother. From 2002 to 2005 the Government of the Cayman Islands sent some delinquent youth to Tranquility Bay; the government funded the students as they were located in Tranquility Bay.

Tranquility Bay was shut down in January 2009, after the case of Isaac Hersh gained national media and political attention and years of alleged abuse and torture came to light. Many politicians, including Hillary Clinton, were involved in Isaac's release.

In popular culture
The "Cassie" episode of the A&E program Intervention, first shown in January 2011, features a young woman addicted to prescription painkillers who had been sent to Tranquility Bay as a child and blamed her father for not rescuing her. In the episode, Cassie alleged that her fellow residents consumed "chemicals" so they would be sent to the hospital and would be able to talk to their parents regarding the abuse they were enduring. However, she alleged that when they vomited in response to the poison, rather than being sent to a hospital, they were restrained by staff face down in their own vomit.

References

Further reading
Art, Cindy. 2012. Trapped in Paradise, A Memoir. . An account of an attendee's time at Tranquility Bay.

External links 

Tranquility Bay website - 

Buildings and structures in Saint Elizabeth Parish
Educational institutions established in 1997
Educational institutions disestablished in 2009
Behavior modification
Boarding schools in Jamaica
Youth rights
Therapeutic boarding schools
Schools in Jamaica
1997 establishments in Jamaica
World Wide Association of Specialty Programs and Schools